Yusufça (former: Yusufçuk) is a town (belde) in the Bucak District, Burdur Province, Turkey. Its population is 2,336 (2021). It is situated in the northern slopes of Toros Mountains. According to town page, the settlement was founded in 1777 by Turkmens. The name Yusufçuk refers to a certain Yusuf who controlled the main water resource of the area in the 18th century. In 1972, Yusufçuk was declared a seat of township. Main economic sector is farming. Tomatoes, carrots and various other crops are produced. There is also some light industry in the town.

References

Gölhisar District
Populated places in Burdur Province